Michael John Minogue  (20 October 1923 – 27 November 2008) was a New Zealand National Party politician, lawyer and mayor.

Biography

Minogue was born on 20 October 1923. He attended Timaru Boys' High School, St. Patrick's College Silverstream, and Victoria University.

He was Mayor of Hamilton, New Zealand from 1968 to 1976, when he resigned to become a Member of Parliament. He was never on good terms with his own party leader, Robert Muldoon, and strongly opposed many of his policies, particularly challenging him on the SIS Bill and cabinet's executive powers. Muldoon then invited him to resign from the party which Minogue refused to do.

He represented the Hamilton West electorate until the 1984 election, when he lost to Labour Party challenger Trevor Mallard.

In the 1990 Queen's Birthday Honours, Minogue was made a Companion of the Queen's Service Order for public services.

Death
Minogue died on 27 November 2008 at Braemar Hospital, Hamilton, aged 85. He was survived by three children. His wife had predeceased him 19 years prior.

References

|-

1923 births
2008 deaths
Deaths from cancer in New Zealand
Companions of the Queen's Service Order
Mayors of Hamilton, New Zealand
Members of the New Zealand House of Representatives
New Zealand National Party MPs
New Zealand Liberal Party (1991) politicians
20th-century New Zealand lawyers
New Zealand MPs for North Island electorates
Place of birth missing
Unsuccessful candidates in the 1984 New Zealand general election
People educated at Timaru Boys' High School
People educated at St. Patrick's College, Silverstream
Victoria University of Wellington alumni